Sa Re Ga Ma Pa Marathi is an Indian Marathi musical game show. It is airing on Zee Marathi from 18 September 2006. The show had completed its 25 years in the year 2020. So, channel had arranged 2.30 hours special episode as live show in lockdown period on 24 May 2020 with named as "Ek Desh, Ek Raag". Previously, this function was planned on May 17, but later it was changed to 24 May.

The show aimed to discover the best singing talent in the age range of 5–15 years from the Maharashtra. The show was judged by singer and composer Avdhoot Gupte and singer Vaishali Samant in addition to other individuals from the Indian music industry who served as guest judges. The show was hosted by actress Pallavi Joshi. The progress of the contestants through the rounds was also dependent on the votes of the audience. The show aired on Monday and Tuesday. The Grand Finale of the thirteen season was aired on 7 January 2018.

Production

Auditions
Auditions for the show up to season 13 were held in Pune, Nashik, Aurangabad, Nagpur, Thane, Kolhapur and Mumbai. For season 14, channel arranged auditions through WhatsApp by making some short video of songs.

Finalist
The top 5 Little Champs Season 1 Finalists are
 Rohit Raut
 Prathamesh Laghate
 Aarya Ambekar
 Mugdha Vaishampayan
 Kartiki Gaikwad

These Top 5 Finalist were invited in the show Chala Hawa Yeu Dya on Zee Marathi for completing 12 years of Sa Re Ga Ma Pa Little Champs Finale from 8–10 February 2021.

Rules
The contest was held in five stages viz. Preliminary, Quarter-Final, Semi-Final, Final and Mega-Final. One contestant was declared the "Little Champ" from these five stages.

A total of 50 contestants were divided across two groups. The first group, "Juniors", had 20 contestants in the age range of 8 to 11 years while the second group had 30 contestants in the age range of 12 to 14 years. The contestants in the 8 to 11 years age group performed on the episodes broadcast on Mondays while the contestants from the 12 to 14 years age group performed on the episodes broadcast on Tuesdays.

Scoring system
In this contest the notes Sa Re Ga Ma Pa Dha Ni was used for scoring. After every performance of every contestant, every judge independently scored the performance.

The scores increased linearly from 'Sa' to 'Ni' and will have values from 'Sa' = 1 to 'Ni' = 7. The result was declared based on the total score from the judges.

In the Final round, the same scoring system will be used to make decisions. The values for the notes will change to 'Sa' = 14, 'Re' = 28, 'Ga' = 42, 'Ma' = 56, 'Pa'= 70, 'Dha' = 85 and 'Ni' = 100.

In the Final round, while making a decision the votes of the viewers was taken into account along with the scores given by the judges. Till the middle of the Final round the weighting given to the votes of the viewers increased while that given to the scores of the judges decreased.

In the first week of the Final round, all the contestants performed but no contestant was eliminated this week. In the following weeks, the viewers had a chance to act as judges. From the second week onwards, the votes of the viewers received via SMS and the scores of the judges resulted in contestants having low scores to be eliminated. In the first week, the weighting of the judges' scores was 90% while that of the viewers' votes was 10%. In the second week, the weighting of the judges' scores was 80% while that of the viewers' votes was 20%. In this manner the weighting of the votes of the viewers and the judges' scores was 50% each by the end of the fifth week. This weighting stayed constant till the Mega-Final. The result of the Mega-Final, though, were solely decided by the votes of the viewers. So also there was a jury of 5 reputed singers which included Shridhar Phadke, Devaki Pandit, Pt. Sanjeev Abhyankar, Suresh Wadkar and Asha Khadilkar, who along with Avadhoot and Vaishali were assessing the participants.

Rounds
The competition consisted of the following rounds.

Preliminary round
Talented contestants who had to leave the contest because of a minor difference in scores were given another chance in a special "Call Back" round. A total of two "Juniors" and four "Seniors" were selected for the Quarter-Final from the "Call Back" round.

Quarter-final
In the second stage, i.e. in the Quarter Final, 12 "Junior" contestants were split across 3 groups while 24 "Senior" contestants were split across 4 groups. "Junior" contestants performed on the episodes broadcast on Mondays while the "Senior" contestants  performed on the episodes broadcast on Tuesdays.

The Quarter-Final round for the "Junior" contestants went on for three weeks. Two contestants were eliminated on every Monday. The six contestants who were selected at the end of the third week competed again in the fourth week. The best four contestants out of these were chosen for the Semi-Final round. The Quarter-Final round for the "Senior" contestants went on for four weeks. Three contestants were eliminated on every Tuesday. At the end of the fourth week, two eliminated contestants whose scores were the highest amongst those eliminated were selected for the Semi-Final round. In this manner, four "Junior" and fourteen "Senior" contestants, for a total of eighteen contestants competed in the Semi-Final round.

Semi-final
The Semi-Final round went on for three weeks. The selected eighteen contestants were split into three groups of six each. There was no distinction between "Seniors" and "Juniors". Every contestant performed a song on the episodes broadcast on Monday and Tuesday. Two contestants were eliminated at the end of the episode broadcast on Tuesdays.

Final
Twelve contestants contested the Final round. Every week one contestant was supposed to leave the contest.

Elimination chart

Round 1 to Semi-Final
Numbers in the cells indicate the episode in which the contestant performed in a <Week>.<Episode> format. For example, 4.1 in the Round 1 column indicates the 1st episode i.e. the one on the Monday of the 4th week of Round 1.

Final and Mega-Final

Seasons

Awards

References

External links 
 

Sa Re Ga Ma Pa
Zee Marathi original programming
Marathi-language television shows
Indian reality television series